Netball at the 2017 Pacific Mini Games in Port Vila, Vanuatu will be held during December 2017.

Only four teams participated after Fiji withdrew late. Papua New Guinea won the gold medal from Tonga. Solomon Islands claimed bronze over hosts Vanuatu.

Pre-event results

Preliminary round

Final standings

See also
 Netball at the Pacific Mini Games

References

 Photos from test event 25 November 2017. Pacific Mini Games official webpage
 Official netball results

2017 Pacific Mini Games
Pacific Mini Games
Netball at the Pacific Games